Rusa IV (died 585 BC) was king of Urartu from 590 BC to 585 BC. Rusa IV was the son and a successor of Rusa III, and the successor of Sarduri IV. His name is mentioned on a number of clay tablets found at Karmir Blur (near Yerevan, Armenia), including tablets bearing his own royal inscriptions. However, almost nothing is known about his reign. He is possibly the Hrachya (Armenian: Հրաչյա) mentioned by the Armenian historian Moses of Khorene.

See also

 List of kings of Urartu

References
 Գ. Ղափանցյան, Ուրարտուի պատմությունը, Yerevan, 1940, pp. 143–152 (in Armenian)
 Пиотровский Б. Б., Ванское царство (Урарту),  Moscow, 1959 (in Russian)
 Арутюнян Н. В., Биайнили (Урарту), Published by Academy of Sciences of Armenian SSR, Yerevan, 1970 (in Russian).
 Арутюнян Н. В., Некоторые вопросы последнего периода истории Урарту // Древний Восток, Published by Academy of Sciences of Armenian SSR, Yerevan, No. 2, 1976 (in Russian)
 Дьяконов И. М., Последние годы Урартского государства по ассиро-вавилонским источникам // Вестник Древней Истории, No 2, 1951 (in Russian)

Urartian kings
6th-century BC rulers
585 BC deaths
Year of birth unknown